This is a list of ski areas and resorts in New Zealand where the public can pay to ski.

North Island

Mount Ruapehu
Tukino (club skifield)
Turoa
Whakapapa

Taranaki
Manganui (club skifield)

South Island

Canterbury
Awakino (club skifield)
Craigieburn Range
Broken River (club skifield)
Craigieburn Valley (club skifield)
Mount Cheeseman  (club skifield)
Mount Olympus (club skifield)
Fox Peak (club skifield)
Hanmer Springs Ski Area (club skifield)
Mount Dobson
Mount Hutt
Mount Lyford
Mount Potts (heliskiing and snowcatting only)
Ohau
Porters Ski Area
Roundhill
Tasman Glacier (Heliski)
Temple Basin  (club skifield)

Nelson Lakes
Rainbow

Otago
Invincible Snowfields (helicopter access only)
Around Queenstown
Coronet Peak
The Remarkables
Around Wanaka
Cardrona Alpine Resort
Snow Farm (cross-country skiing only)
Treble Cone

See also
List of ski areas and resorts
List of ski areas and resorts in Oceania
Skiing in New Zealand

Ski